Pharisburg (originally known as Scotts Corners) is an unincorporated community in Leesburg Township, Union County, Ohio, United States.

Pharisburg was platted in 1848 by Allen Pharis. The community was originally called Scotts Corners, but changed its name for the Pharis family.  The Pharisburg Post office was established as the Pharisburgh Post Office on April 25, 1840, but was discontinued on October 24, 1845. It was reestablished on September 7, 1848, and the name was changed to Pharisburg Post Office on March 26, 1892. The Post Office was finally discontinued on April 15, 1908. The mail service is now sent through the Marysville branch.

References 

Unincorporated communities in Union County, Ohio
Unincorporated communities in Ohio